Upton-by-Chester High School is a coeducational state high school located in the United Kingdom. It is situated on St James's Avenue in Upton. The headteacher is Mr Cummins.

Houses
The school has five houses, or Halls as they are known within the school. They have two forms from each year and take part in competitions within their hall or with the entire year or school and are awarded hall points for success.

The Halls are named after five people:
Muhammad Yunus (red)
John Wood (yellow)
Chico Mendes (green)
Malala Yousafzai (blue)
Wangari Maathai (purple)

Site and facilities
The school is situated on St James Avenue in a residential area near the countryside. The site has seven blocks: A Block, B Block, C Block, D Block, E Block, T Block and the Labs.

Students
There are approximately 1,700 students on roll, with a maximum of 280 students in each year. There are ten forms in each year who are split into two sides of the year: X Side and Y Side.
In the final year, students are given the chance to become Prefects, Head Boy or Head Girl of their hall. The candidates make speeches and are elected by their hall.

Curriculum
The school offers English, Maths, Biology, Chemistry, Physics, Geography, History, Religious Studies, I.T, D.T, Cooking, Textiles, French, Spanish, Art, Music and P.E through years 7-8.

Offered through GCSE are English, Maths, Further Science, Additional Science, Dual Award, BTEC Animal Care, Geography, History, Philosophy and Ethics, Information and Communication Technology, Computer Science, Media Studies - Dual Award, Media Studies - Single Award, Textiles, Product design, Graphics, Electronics, Art and Design, Music, P.E, Business Studies, Photography, Dance, Drama, French, Spanish, and Health and Social Care.

At A Level the subjects offered include English Language, English Literature, Maths, Further Maths, Biology, Chemistry, Physics, History, Geography, Religious Studies, Psychology, Sociology,  Art, Photography, Media, French, Spanish, Technology (Resistant Materials & Textiles), Computing, Music, Drama and the EPQ

Notable former pupils
 Tom Hughes (actor)
 Tom Heaton (footballer)
 Harry Pickering (footballer)

References

Secondary schools in Cheshire West and Chester
Foundation schools in Cheshire West and Chester
Schools in Chester
Educational institutions established in 1968